Ivan IX Frankopan Cetinski was a Croatian nobleman. A member of Cetin branch of the Frankopan noble family and a grandson of Ivan VI (Anž) Frankopan, Cetinski was the knez (prince) of Cetin Castle.

Cetinski was one of the commanders of Croatian forces in the Battle of Krbava field, in which he died. His son, Franjo Frankopan, became archbishop of Kalocsa.

See also
Ivan VI (Anž) Frankopan 
Frankopan family tree

External links

Frankopan - the lord of Cetin castle

Ivan
Military personnel killed in action
Military commanders of Croatian kingdoms
15th-century Croatian military personnel
Year of birth missing
1493 deaths
15th-century Croatian nobility
Croatian Roman Catholics
15th-century Croatian people